The Geraldine R. Dodge Foundation is an American philanthropic organization based in Morristown, New Jersey which nurtures leaders, ideas, and institutions that transcend self-interest and promote a sustainable future. The foundation believes that philanthropy includes not only providing resources, but also connecting leaders across sectors, sharing expertise, and promoting collaboration to help build movements for change in important matters. It funds New Jersey-focused arts, education, environment, and media initiatives that are innovative and promote collaboration and community-driven decision making and offers a technical assistance program geared towards strengthening the capacity of the state's nonprofit community.

History
The Dodge Foundation was established in 1974 through a bequest from Mrs. Geraldine Dodge, daughter of William and Almira Rockefeller, and has grown to become one of the largest private foundations in New Jersey. Since its inception, Dodge has awarded nearly $450 million in grants. It awards about $11 million in grants annually through three grant cycles. Chris Daggett became President and CEO of the foundation in 2010.

Major initiatives 
In 1986, the Dodge Foundation launched the biennial Geraldine R. Dodge Poetry Festival, the largest poetry event in North America, and in the following year spawned a complementary Poetry-in-the-Schools Program.

In the aftermath of Superstorm Sandy, the foundation provided a lead gift to the New Jersey Recovery Fund, hosted by the Community Foundation of New Jersey with support from local and national foundations, New Jersey corporations and individuals. The New Jersey Recovery Fund, one of the top philanthropic supporters of the state's Sandy recovery, awarded 25 grants totaling more than $4 million to groups working to address the Sandy recovery in several key areas: planning and environment, public information and engagement, community health, and the arts.

Other major initiatives of the Dodge Foundation include Sustainable Jersey and Creative New Jersey.

References

External links
Geraldine R. Dodge Foundation website

Conservation and environmental foundations in the United States
Organizations established in 1973